The Oakes Post Office in Oakes, North Dakota, United States, is a post office building that was built in 1935.  It was listed on the National Register of Historic Places in 1989 as U.S. Post Office-Oakes.

The design is credited to Louis A. Simon; building was done by the McGough Brothers.

References

Government buildings completed in 1935
Post office buildings on the National Register of Historic Places in North Dakota
National Register of Historic Places in Dickey County, North Dakota
Stripped Classical architecture in the United States
1935 establishments in North Dakota